Rebel Era is the third album by the electronic musician Grant Kwiecinski, released under the pseudonym GRiZ on 15 October 2013 under the All Good Records. The album is a collection of tracks made during 2012-13. On his blog Kwiecinski states the current global events was the biggest source  inspiration for the album.

Track listing

References

GRiZ albums
2013 albums